Bashnij (also Romanized as Bashnīj; also known as Bashnījābād) is a village in Mazul Rural District, in the Central District of Nishapur County, Razavi Khorasan Province, Iran. At the 2006 census, its population was 693, in 184 families.

References 

Populated places in Nishapur County